Rices Spring is a spring in Floyd County, in the U.S. state of Georgia.

Rices Spring was named for the Rice family, the original landowners.

See also
List of rivers of Georgia (U.S. state)

References

Bodies of water of Floyd County, Georgia
Rivers of Georgia (U.S. state)